The 2016–17 Rugby Pro D2 was the second-level French rugby union club competition, behind the Top 14, for the 2016–17 season. It ran alongside the 2016–17 Top 14 competition; both competitions are operated by the Ligue Nationale de Rugby (LNR).

Teams

Changes in the lineup from 2015–16 were:
 Lyon won the 2015–16 Pro D2 title and were thereby automatically promoted to the Top 14. Bayonne won the promotion playoffs to secure the second promotion place.
 The bottom finisher in 2015–16, Provence Rugby was relegated from Pro D2 to Fédérale 1. Tarbes was also relegated for financial reasons. 
 The two bottom finishers in the 2015–16 Top 14 season, Oyonnax and Agen, were relegated to Pro D2.
 Soyaux Angoulême and Vannes won the Fédérale 1 promotion playoffs. The 2015–16 season was the first in which the promotion playoffs were separated from those for the traditional Fédérale 1 championship prize, Trophée Jean-Prat.

Competition format
The top team at the end of the regular season (after all the teams played one another twice, once at home, once away), is declared champion and earns a spot in the next Top 14 season. Teams ranked second to fifth compete in promotion playoffs, with the semifinals being played at the home ground of the higher-ranked team. The final is then played on neutral ground, and the winner earns the second ticket to the next Top 14.

The LNR uses a slightly different bonus points system from that used in most other rugby competitions. It trialled a new system in 2007–08 explicitly designed to prevent a losing team from earning more than one bonus point in a match, a system that also made it impossible for either team to earn a bonus point in a drawn match. LNR chose to continue with this system for subsequent seasons.

France's bonus point system operates as follows:

 4 points for a win.
 2 points for a draw.
 1 bonus point for winning while scoring at least 3 more tries than the opponent. This replaces the standard bonus point for scoring 4 tries regardless of the match result.
 1 bonus point for losing by 5 points (or less). The required margin had been 7 points or less until being changed in advance of the 2014–15 season.

The 2016–17 season was the last for the then-current Pro D2 promotion system. From 2017 to 2018 forward, Pro D2 will institute a playoff system identical to the one currently used in Top 14, with the top six teams qualifying for the playoffs and the top two teams receiving byes into the semifinals. The league championship and automatic promotion place will go to the winner of the playoffs; the runner-up will enter a playoff with the second-from-bottom Top 14 team, with the winner of that playoff taking up the final place in Top 14 for the following season.

Table

Relegation
Normally, the teams that finish in 15th and 16th places in the table are relegated to Fédérale 1 at the end of the season.  In certain circumstances, "financial reasons" may cause a higher-placed team to be demoted instead, or prevent one of the two finalists in Fédérale 1 from promotion.

Fixtures

Round 1

Round 2

Round 3

Round 4

Round 5

Round 6

Round 7

Round 8

Round 9

Round 10

Round 11

Round 12

Round 13

Round 14

Round 15

Round 16

Round 17

Round 18

Round 19

Round 20

Round 21

Round 22

Round 23

Round 24

Round 25

Round 26

Round 27

Round 28

Round 29

Round 30

Play–offs
The highest ranked team at the end of the regular season, Oyonnax Rugby, earned automatic promotion to the Top 14 as champion de France de PRO D2 2017.

Semi–finals
The semi–finals followed a 2 v 5, 3 v 4 system, with the higher ranked team playing at home.

Final
The winners of the semi–finals played off for the second promotion spot to the Top 14.

Leading scorers
Note: Flags to the left of player names indicate national team as has been defined under World Rugby eligibility rules, or primary nationality for players who have not yet earned international senior caps. Players may hold one or more non-WR nationalities.

Top points scorers

Top try scorers

Number of teams by regions

See also
2016–17 Top 14 season

References

External links
  Ligue Nationale de Rugby – Official website
  Midi Olympique

2016-17
2016–17 in French rugby union leagues